Kataghan, Katagan, and Qataghan may refer to: 

Katagan, a town in Tajikistan.
Qataghan Province, a former province in Afghanistan.
Qataghan-Badakhshan Province, a former province in Afghanistan.